Fraunhofer FDK AAC is an open-source library for encoding and decoding digital audio in the Advanced Audio Coding (AAC) format. Fraunhofer IIS, developed this library for Android 4.1. It supports several Audio Object Types including MPEG-2 and MPEG-4 AAC LC, HE-AAC (AAC LC + SBR), HE-AACv2 (LC + SBR + PS) as well AAC-LD (low delay) and AAC-ELD (enhanced low delay) for real-time communication. The encoding library supports sample rates up to 96 kHz and up to eight channels (7.1 surround).

Operation 
The Android-targeted implementation of the Fraunhofer AAC encoder uses fixed-point math and is optimized for encoding on embedded devices/mobile phones. The library is currently limited to 16-bit PCM input. Other versions of the Fraunhofer encoder, like the one included in Winamp, are optimized for encoding music on desktop-class processors. Those versions of the encoder, however, are not open-source and require a commercial license. Version 2 of the library, introduced with Android P, also includes support for xHE-AAC and AAC-ELD v2. xHE-AAC extends the operating range of the codec from 12 to 300 kb/s for stereo signals and allows seamless switching between bitrates over this range for adaptive bitrate delivery (using standards such as MPEG-DASH or HLS for example). xHE-AAC also includes MPEG-D DRC mandatory loudness control to playback content at a consistent volume and offers new dynamic range control profiles for listening in noisy situations.

The FDK AAC encoder employs a more aggressive default low-pass filter than is used in other codecs. Higher frequencies are removed so that more bits are available to better describe sounds of lower frequencies, improving the overall quality for most combinations of recordings and listeners. In some, not completely rare, combinations the missing high frequencies are noticeable. The library allows overriding the low-pass filter setting, and in the highest VBR mode effectively applies no filter at all.

A cross-platform source distribution is maintained by Martin Storsjö as part of the opencore-amr project under the name fdk-aac. The code compiles into a shared library, libfdk-aac. The media frameworks FFmpeg and Libav support audio encoding through libfdk-aac.

Licensing 
The license included by Fraunhofer in the FDK library source code allows redistribution in source or binary forms, but does not license patented technologies described by the code. The license states that the library may only be used for purposes as authorized by patent licenses. Due to this restriction, along with a limitation on charging for the library, Debian considers it non-free. It was classified as free by Fedora after a review by the legal department at Red Hat. The FSF also considers it to be free, though discourages its use due to the explicit lack of a patent grant. Via Licensing administers a patent pool that includes patent licenses for the AAC codecs, including xHE-AAC and MPEG-D DRC. The FDK license also states that "most manufacturers of Android devices already license these patent claims through Via Licensing or directly from the patent owners, and therefore FDK AAC Codec software may already be covered under those patent licenses when it is used for those licensed purposes only."

See also
 Nero AAC Codec
 FAAC
 MPEG-4 Part 3

References

External links
Information

Fraunhofer AAC Audio Playback Test Site
Fraunhofer FDK AAC at Hydrogenaudio Knowledgebase
Detailed information about the Fraunhofer FDK AAC encoder used in the EZ CD Audio Converter
Via Licensing Advanced Audio Coding

Implementations
Official FDK source code repository at the Android Open Source Project
fdk-aac at Debian Package Tracker
"libfdk-aac" repo at GitHub — FDK AAC as a shared library
"fdkaac" repo at GitHub.com – a cross-platform command-line encoding and metadata utility that employs the libfdk-aac shared library
"fdk-aac-win32-builder repo" at GitHub – a script for compiling the two repos above. (The binaries cannot distributed because of the FDK AAC licensing.)

Audio codecs
Cross-platform software